Gaetz is a surname, and may refer to:

Gaetz political family
 Jerry Gaetz (1914–1964), American politician, member of the North Dakota Senate
 Don Gaetz (born 1948), American politician, member of the Florida Senate; son of Jerry Gaetz
 Matt Gaetz (born 1982), American politician (U.S. House of Representatives from Florida 2017–); son of Don Gaetz
 John Gaetz (1857–1937), Canadian politician
 Leonard Gaetz (1841–1907), Canadian politician
 Link Gaetz (born 1968), Canadian-Finnish ice hockey player
 Nelson Gaetz (1907–1988), Canadian politician
 Sharon Gaetz (21st century), Canadian politician
 Stephen Gaetz, Canadian professor